"Mars University" is episode eleven of the first season of Futurama. It originally aired on the Fox network in the United States on October 3, 1999. This episode was written by J. Stewart Burns and directed by Bret Haaland.

Plot
The Planet Express crew's latest mission is to deliver a crate to Professor Farnsworth's office at Mars University. While touring the campus, Bender comes across a chapter of his old fraternity, Epsilon Rho Rho (Err). The nerdy fraternity brothers beg Bender for his help in the art of being cool, as "even Hillel has better parties than us!" Fry finds out that his 20th century college dropout status is equivalent to only a 31st-century high school dropout. Knowing this, he vows to enroll, and drop out all over again. In a scene straight from Animal House, Bender and the Robot House boys climb a ladder to peek in a girls' dorm window (in reality, they only try to see one of the girls' computers as it malfunctions, which to Bender and the nerd-bots is a turn-on). A risque mishap happens when Bender's extendable eyes causes them to fall. The accident crushes Snooty House's servants' quarters and presumably the servants themselves.

Fry gets a room in the financial aid dorm, and finds his roommate Günter is an intelligent monkey wearing an undersized hat. The Professor reveals that Günter was the content of the crate that they delivered, and that the electronium hat is the source of Günter's intelligence. Bender and the Robot House members get called before Dean Vernon, who places them on dodecatuple secret probation and have to run out after Fatbot eats the Dean's model ship. At the parents' reception, Fry humiliates Günter by releasing Günter's unintelligent, feral parents from their cage. Later, Günter expresses his unhappiness at his current life. At the 20th century history exam, the stress finally becomes too much for him, and he tosses the hat aside, jumps out the window, and flees into the Martian jungle. While Fry, Leela, and the Professor head off into the jungle to find Günter, Robot House enters the fraternity raft regatta in a bid to lift their probation status. When Günter is found, the Professor offers him the hat, and Fry offers him a banana.

Before Günter can decide, Robot House speeds past with Bender on water skis. The boat's wake drags the humans into the river and towards a waterfall. Günter puts the hat on and rescues them, but falls off a cliff. The Planet Express Crew believe him to be dead, and go to "gather him up". They find however, that the hat broke his fall, and is now only working at half-capacity. Günter announces that he likes the new reduced-capacity hat, and that he has decided to transfer to business school, to the horror of Professor Farnsworth. Robot House wins the regatta, and a parade in their honor is held, led by an unhappy Dean Vernon. The episode ends with a party at Robot House, and an epilogue shown in the style of Animal House and American Graffiti where captions explain that Fry successfully dropped out of college and returned to Planet Express, Günter went to business school to get his MBA and became The FOX Network's latest CEO, Fat-Bot caught a virus in Tijuana and had to be rebooted, Leela went on a date with Dean Vernon (and Vernon never called her again), and with his task done, Bender stole everything of value from Robot House and ran off.

Broadcast and reception
In a review of the episode, Space.com criticized Futurama for the disconnectedness of the episodes and the lack of a large recurring cast and questioned the time spent in developing Günter's character when it is unlikely that he will return as a major character.  The episode itself was praised for its references to classic frat films such as Animal House and Revenge of the Nerds though the reference to Lite-Brite was found to be lacking. Zack Handlen of The A.V. Club gave the episode a B+, stating, "Even with a plot as fundamentally absurd as this one, the writers still manage to find some authenticity. That makes a for a good half-hour of television, even if it’s not one I have a lot to say about." In 2006 IGN ranked this episode as number 21 in their list of the top 25 Futurama episodes.  The episode was initially ranked higher in the list, particularly for its many references to Animal House and its appeal to fans of the film, it was eventually moved to 21st place and replaced by episodes which were perceived as having better storytelling.

Cultural references
Much of the plot references scenes from Animal House – Robot House takes the place of Delta House, and the school is headed by "Dean Vernon" instead of "Dean Vernon Wormer"; Delta House's "double secret probation" becomes Robot House's "dodecatuple secret probation", and so on.  There are also references to Good Will Hunting. When Professor Farnsworth is lecturing on the effects of quantum neutrino fields, the blackboard behind him displays an explanation of "Superdupersymmetric String Theory" and a diagram explaining "Witten's Dog". Witten's Dog, named after Ed Witten, is a parody of the classic Schroedinger's Cat paradox. Astrophysicist David Schiminovich created both the equations and the diagram, based on "an equation that constrains the mass density of neutrinos in the universe".

References

External links

Mars University at the Internet Movie Database
Mars University at TVSquad.com
Mars University at The Infosphere.

Futurama (season 1) episodes
Mars in television
1999 American television episodes
Fictional universities and colleges